Tympanocentesis is the drainage of fluid from the middle ear usually caused by otitis media, by using a small-gauge needle to puncture the tympanic membrane, also known as the eardrum.

Main indication for tympanocentesis is failed treatment with antibiotics

It is sometimes referred to as a "tap" and, when conducted twice as part of a clinical trial of medication, a "double tap."

References

 http://www.webmd.com/a-to-z-guides/Tympanocentesis-for-ear-infections
 https://www.fda.gov/ohrms/DOCKETS/ac/01/briefing/3802b1_02_FDA.pdf

Ear surgery